Emily Berrington (born 7 December 1985) is an English actress who played Simone Al-Harazi in 24: Live Another Day (2014) and Niska in the Channel 4 and AMC TV series Humans (2015–2018).

Early life
Berrington's parents were social workers. She has three siblings: Amy, a professor in the United States; Tom, who works for IMG in Abu Dhabi; and Katie, who writes for Vogue. Berrington attended Cheney School and later studied development geography at King's College London.

Career
Berrington was involved in youth drama but pursued a career in politics, working at the House of Commons for Labour Party MP Siobhain McDonagh of the London constituency of Mitcham and Morden. In 2009 she won a place studying acting at the Guildhall School of Music and Drama, graduating in 2012.

While studying there she had a part in the Almeida Theatre's production of Children's Children, and also in Michael Winterbottom's The Look of Love.

In 2013 she starred as Jane Shore in the period drama The White Queen, and in 2014 she appeared as Stacey in the BBC sitcom Outnumbered and as Simone Al-Harazi in the thriller series 24: Live Another Day. Her character in 24 had been planned to appear in two episodes, but that was expanded to seven. Her first major supporting film role came in the 2014 comedy film The Inbetweeners 2.

Between 2015 and 2018, in 24 episodes over three seasons, she portrayed Niska in Channel 4's TV series Humans.

From 2017 to 2020 she played Chloe in Richard Herring's sitcom Relativity on BBC Radio 4.

Filmography

2022.       The Stranger in Our Bed  Charlotte

References

External links

Emily Berrington - interview & photos in  The Protagonist Magazine 

1985 births
Living people
Actresses from Oxfordshire
Alumni of King's College London
English film actresses
English television actresses
21st-century English actresses